The José Celso Barbosa House Museum is a historic house museum in Bayamón municipality, Puerto Rico.

The house was added to the U.S. National Register of Historic Places in 1984, under the name Casa Natal Dr. José Celso Barbosa.

See also
National Register of Historic Places listings in metropolitan San Juan, Puerto Rico

References

External links

Vernacular architecture
Houses on the National Register of Historic Places in Puerto Rico
Museums in Bayamón, Puerto Rico
Historic house museums in Puerto Rico
Houses completed in 1850
1850 establishments in Puerto Rico